Pipersville is an unincorporated community in Bedminster and Plumstead Townships in Bucks County, Pennsylvania, United States. Pipersville is located at the intersection of Pennsylvania State Routes 413 and 611.

Pipersville comprises several agricultural properties, most of which are subject to conservation easements that do not permit subdivisions or development. 

Nicknames include “The Ville” and/or “Pipes.”

References

Unincorporated communities in Bucks County, Pennsylvania
Unincorporated communities in Pennsylvania